Ole Olsen (7 June 1869 – 7 September 1944) was a Danish sport shooter who competed at the 1908 and 1912 Summer Olympics.

In 1908 he finished fourth with the Danish team in the team free rifle competition and eighth in the team military rifle event. Four years later, he won the bronze medal as member of the Danish team in the team free rifle competition. In the 300 m free rifle, three positions event, he finished twelfth.

References

External links
profile

1869 births
1944 deaths
Danish male sport shooters
ISSF rifle shooters
Olympic shooters of Denmark
Shooters at the 1908 Summer Olympics
Shooters at the 1912 Summer Olympics
Olympic bronze medalists for Denmark
Olympic medalists in shooting
Medalists at the 1912 Summer Olympics